Theodore Michael Elliott (born November 16, 1964) is a former American football defensive tackle who played for the New Orleans Saints in 1987. He played college football at Minnesota State University (then known as Mankato State University).

References 

1964 births
Living people
American football defensive tackles
Minnesota State Mavericks football players
New Orleans Saints players

Minnesota State University, Mankato alumni